Amy Shira Teitel is a Canadian author, popular science writer, spaceflight historian, and YouTuber.

Career

Writer
Amy Shira Teitel is a native of Toronto. She has written for The Daily Beast, National Geographic, Discovery News, Scientific American, Ars Technica, and Al Jazeera English.

Teitel's first book was based on research for her master's degree thesis. Breaking the Chains of Gravity (2015) tells the story of America's nascent space program. The book describes the early pioneers of rockets in the late 1920s, up to the formation of NASA.

Teitel's Fighting for Space: Two Pilots and Their Historic Battle for Female Spaceflight (2020) is a dual biography of female pilots Jacqueline Cochran and Jerrie Cobb.

Video and other media
In 2012, Teitel created the YouTube channel, The Vintage Space, in which she delves into the early history of space flight.

Teitel was a co-host for the Discovery Channel's online DNews channel, which later became Seeker. She has also appeared on Ancient Aliens, NASA's Unexplained Files, and other cable documentary shows.

Bibliography
 Amy Shira Teitel, Breaking the chains of gravity : the story of spaceflight before NASA London : Bloomsbury Sigma, 2015.  
 Fighting for Space: Two Pilots and Their Historic Battle for Female Spaceflight Grand Central Publishing, 2020

References

External links
 
 

Canadian science writers
American science journalists
Living people
American YouTubers
Canadian YouTubers
Jewish women writers
Writers from Toronto
Canadian expatriates in the United States
Women science writers
Year of birth missing (living people)